Ashley Compton-Dando (born 23 August 1951) is a British former professional tennis player.

Compton-Dando, a native of Essex, is the son of an antiques dealer. Deaf since birth, he played with the aide of an earphone connected to a short-wave radio, which was strapped to his side. He received coaching from Lew Hoad at a tennis school in Berkhamsted. In 1973 he partnered Phil Siviter in the doubles main draw at Wimbledon.

References

External links
 
 

1951 births
Living people
British male tennis players
English male tennis players
Tennis people from Essex
Deaf tennis players